Grevillea crowleyae is a species of flowering plant in the family Proteaceae and is endemic to a restricted area in the south-west of Western Australia. It is a dense, spreading shrub with deeply divided leaves usually with three to seven linear lobes, and grey, pale yellowish or greenish flowers with a maroon-black style.

Description

Taxonomy
Grevillea crowleyae was first formally described in 1993 by Peter M. Olde and Neil R. Marriott in the journal Nuytsia from specimens collected by Olde near Darkan in 1991. The specific epithet (crowleyae) honours Valma Crowley, an amateur naturalist.

Distribution and habitat
This grevillea is only known about ten plants growing in a disturbed site in gravel pit in forest at the type location in the south-west of Western Australia.

Conservation status
Grevillea corrugata is listed as "Priority Two" by the Western Australian Government Department of Biodiversity, Conservation and Attractions, meaning that it is poorly known and from only one or a few locations.

See also
 List of Grevillea species

References

crowleyae
Proteales of Australia
Eudicots of Western Australia
Endemic flora of Western Australia
Plants described in 1993